El Cid Campeador is an outdoor equestrian statue depicting the Spanish knight El Cid by artist Anna Hyatt Huntington, architect William Templeton Johnson, and the foundry General Bronze Company, installed at Balboa Park's Plaza de Panama, in San Diego, California. The bronze sculpture was created in 1927 and dedicated on July 5, 1930. The statue measures approximately 11 x 9 x 7 ft, with a 16-foot diameter, and its concrete or Indiana limestone base measures approximately 11 x 14 x 8 ft. It was surveyed and deemed "treatment needed" by the Smithsonian Institution's "Save Outdoor Sculpture!" program in March 1994.

Copies of Huntington's statue exist in other cities, including Buenos Aires, New York City, San Francisco, Seville, and Valencia. The New York cast is on the grounds of the Hispanic Society of America on Audubon Terrace in Manhattan. Anna Hyatt Huntington  was the wife of Archer M. Huntington, the society's founder.

Gallery

See also

 1927 in art

References

1927 sculptures
Balboa Park (San Diego)
Bronze sculptures in California
Cultural depictions of El Cid
Equestrian statues in Argentina
Equestrian statues in California
Equestrian statues in New York City
Equestrian statues in Spain
Monuments and memorials in Argentina
Monuments and memorials in California
Monuments and memorials in Manhattan
Monuments and memorials in Spain
Outdoor sculptures in Argentina
Outdoor sculptures in Manhattan
Outdoor sculptures in San Diego
Outdoor sculptures in San Francisco
Outdoor sculptures in Spain
Sculptures of men in Argentina
Sculptures of men in California
Sculptures of men in New York City
Sculptures of men in Spain
Statues of military officers